Joseph Moses Gerald Gordon (December 14, 1933 – September 11, 2016) was a prominent South African architect, Professor (1976–1994) at the University of Witwatersrand School of Architecture, and Honorary Research Fellow of the university (1994-2016). He is best known for inventing the "Thin-Skin" building method. His papers and drawings are archived at the University of the Witwatersrand School of Architecture & Planning. He was president of the Transvaal (now Gauteng) Institute of Architects in 1978 and 1979. His residential home was commemorated with a "Blue Plaque" by the Johannesburg Heritage Foundation in 2021.

References

South African architects
1933 births
2016 deaths